All For Love was a Granada television production consisting of adaptations of short stories by authors such as Rumer Godden, Elizabeth Taylor, and William Trevor. The series presents 12 unrelated episodes all concerning various types of human love.

Four episodes from the series were broadcast in the US on PBS as part of their Masterpiece Theatre series. They were Mona, L'Elegance, A Bit of Singing and Dancing, and Letting the Birds Go Free.

Episodes

Reception
John O’Connor of the ‘’New York Times’’ reviewed the first episode, “A Dedicated Man”  called the production "exquisite” and “turns out to be a quietly unsettling slice of British life. It provides a very impressive debut for the series.”.

References

External links
 

1982 British television series debuts
1983 British television series endings
1980s British drama television series
English-language television shows
Television shows produced by Granada Television